The RT-21 Temp 2S was a mobile intercontinental ballistic missile developed by the Soviet Union during the Cold War.  It was assigned the NATO reporting name SS-16 Sinner and carried the industry designation 15Zh42.

The RT-21 was the first mobile ICBM developed in the world. Its innovative concept and design were created by Alexander Nadiradze.  The RT-21M Pioner and succeeding missile complexes relied on the RT-21 base concept and were used by Nadiradze for many of his later projects.  The program became mired in a series of treaty complications, including questions regarding its use of theatre missile launchers.  It is unlikely that the RT-21 ultimately reached deployment, and by the mid-1980s, the program had been scrapped. Its maximum period of storage on a launcher was 5 years, and preparation time for launch was 40 minutes.

See also
 Strategic Rocket Forces
 RT-2PM Topol
 RT-2PM2 Topol-M
 RS-24 Yars
 RS-26 Rubezh
 RS-28 Sarmat
 R-36 (missile)
 UR-100N
TR-1 Temp

References

External links
 Global Security:  RT-21 / SS-16 SINNER

Cold War intercontinental ballistic missiles of the Soviet Union
RT-021
Votkinsk Machine Building Plant products
Military vehicles introduced in the 1970s
Military equipment introduced in the 1970s